The Belgrave Sewer District (also known as the Belgrave Water Pollution Control District) is a public sewer district in Nassau County, on Long Island, in New York, United States. It serves portions of the Great Neck area of Long Island's North Shore.

Description 
The Belgrave Sewer District is one of three sewage systems in the Great Neck area – the other two being the Great Neck Sewer District and the Great Neck Village Sewer System. It is considered a special district of the Town of North Hempstead.

The district's sewage treatment plant is located adjacent to Little Neck Bay. In 1971, the government criticized the district in a pollution report for inadequately handling sewage; it was stated that the district was responsible for polluting Little Neck Bay.

In the mid-1970s, the Belgrave Sewer District proposed filling in a 150-by-290-foot area of the Udalls Cove wetlands near its sewage treatment plant, which at the time was 46 years old. The proposal was denied by the Village of Great Neck Estates and the New York State Department of Environmental Conservation, which stated that the project would cause severe damage to the surrounding environment.

The Belgrave Sewer District is headquartered in Great Neck.

Communities served 

 Lake Success (under contract with that village)
 Portions of Great Neck Estates
 Portions of Great Neck Plaza
 Portions of Thomaston
 Russell Gardens
 University Gardens

See also 

 Port Washington Water Pollution Control District

References 

Town of North Hempstead, New York
Sewer districts in Nassau County, New York
Sewerage infrastructure in the United States